USCGC Kangaroo, later USCGC AB-6, was United States Coast Guard patrol boat in commission from 1919 to 1932.

Construction and United States Navy service

Kangaroo was built as the private motorboat Herreshoff Hull # 316 in May 1917 by the Herreshoff Manufacturing Company at Bristol, Rhode Island, one of nine identical motor boats built in anticipation of eventual acquisition by the United States Navy from their private owners. The U.S. Navy purchased her for World War I service later that year, and she was in commission as USS Kangaroo (SP-1284) from 1917 to 1919.

United States Coast Guard service

USS Kangaroo had been out of commission for six months when the U.S. Navy transferred her to the United States Department of the Treasury at Key West, Florida, on 22 November 1919, for use by the U.S. Coast Guard. The Coast Guard commissioned her as USCGC Kangaroo.

The Coast Guard used Kangaroo for customs and coastal surveillance patrols. She served at Key West until assigned to Charleston, South Carolina, on 1 January 1923. She was renamed USCGC AB-6 on 6 November 1923, and later served at Norfolk, Virginia.

AB-6 was sold at Norfolk on 1 October 1932 to John H. Curtis for $200 (USD).

Notes

References
United States Coast Guard Historian's Office: Kangaroo, 1919 (AB-6)

Department of the Navy: Naval Historical Center: Online Library of Selected Images: U.S. Navy Ships: USS Kangaroo (SP-1284), 1917-1919. Originally civilian motor boat Herreshoff Hull # 316 and Kangaroo (1917)
NavSource Online: Section Patrol Craft Photo Archive Kangaroo (SP 1284)

Ships of the United States Coast Guard
Ships built in Bristol, Rhode Island
1917 ships